Penzance is a special service area in the Rural Municipality of Sarnia No. 221, in the Canadian province of Saskatchewan. It held village status prior to January 31, 2008. The community is located 88 km north of the City of Moose Jaw on Highway 2. Penzance was named after the original Penzance, in Cornwall, England.

Demographics 

See also 
 List of communities in Saskatchewan
 List of hamlets in Saskatchewan

References 

Designated places in Saskatchewan
Former villages in Saskatchewan
Sarnia No. 221, Saskatchewan
Special service areas in Saskatchewan
Populated places disestablished in 2008
Division No. 6, Saskatchewan